Pierre Pleimelding (19 September 1952 – 1 May 2013) was a French football striker and manager who obtained a cap for France. He is the son of another professional football player, René Pleimelding and the brother of Gérard Pleimelding.

External links
 Player bio at the official web site of the French Football Federation
 Stats

1952 births
2013 deaths
People from Laxou
French footballers
France international footballers
French expatriate footballers
Ligue 1 players
Ligue 2 players
AS Nancy Lorraine players
ES Troyes AC players
AS Monaco FC players
Lille OSC players
Servette FC players
AS Cannes players
FC Mulhouse players
SAS Épinal players
Expatriate footballers in Switzerland
French football managers
Ivory Coast national football team managers
1996 African Cup of Nations managers
Association football forwards
Sportspeople from Meurthe-et-Moselle
SAS Épinal managers
Footballers from Grand Est
French expatriate sportspeople in Ivory Coast
French expatriate football managers
Expatriate football managers in Ivory Coast
French expatriate sportspeople in Switzerland